"The Apartment" is the fifth episode of the second season of the NBC sitcom Seinfeld and the show's tenth episode overall. In the episode, protagonist Jerry Seinfeld (Jerry Seinfeld) gets his ex-girlfriend Elaine Benes (Julia Louis-Dreyfus) an apartment above his, but regrets this after realizing it might be uncomfortable living so close together. Meanwhile, Jerry's friend George Costanza (Jason Alexander) wears a wedding ring to a party to see what effect it will have on women.

The episode was written by Peter Mehlman and directed by Tom Cherones. Series co-creators Seinfeld and Larry David asked Mehlman to write an episode for the show after they read a few articles he wrote for newspapers and magazines. Mehlman originally had the idea of Elaine moving away from Jerry, but David and Seinfeld felt it would be funnier if Elaine moved closer to Jerry instead. "The Apartment" was first broadcast in the United States on April 4, 1991, on NBC (and was the first new episode of the series after the underwhelming reception of the previous episode, "The Phone Message" caused it to go on a two-month hiatus), and was watched in 15.7 million homes, making it the ninth most-watched program of the week it was broadcast. The episode gained mostly positive responses from critics.

Plot
While Elaine is depressed about the low quality of her apartment, Jerry overhears Harold (Glenn Shadix) and Manny (Tony Plana), the managers of his apartment building, discussing a death that makes an apartment available. Shocked by the low rent, Jerry tells Elaine that he will be able to get her the apartment above his. She is extremely excited to hear this, as she will be able to live near Jerry. Jerry belatedly realizes how intrusive Elaine might become and discusses his problem with George. They also talk about how women seem attracted to men wearing wedding rings. George borrows one from Kramer to test this hypothesis at a party.

Harold and Manny inform Jerry that someone else has offered $5,000 for the apartment, so they will give it to him unless Elaine matches his bid. Jerry sees this as a perfect escape, since Elaine cannot afford the higher rent. Kramer walks in on Jerry breaking the news to Elaine. Oblivious to Jerry's real feelings, he pressures him to lend Elaine the rent money. After she leaves, Jerry rebukes Kramer for his faux pas. Later, Elaine, Jerry and George go a party where Elaine asks Jerry if it would be uncomfortable for them to live so close to each other; Jerry says he's not worried about it but soon feels stupid for not telling her the truth. George's wedding ring plan backfires, as women who are otherwise attracted to him are unwilling to pursue a married man. To make up for his earlier mistake, Kramer finds somebody who is willing to pay $10,000 for the apartment, a sum so large Elaine would not be willing to borrow it from Jerry. However, the new renter is a musician who constantly plays loud music, and Jerry ends up regretting not letting Elaine rent the apartment.

Production

"The Apartment" was written by Peter Mehlman and directed by Tom Cherones. Seinfeld and co-creator Larry David contacted Mehlman and asked him to write an episode for the show after reading a few articles Mehlman had written for The New York Times and Esquire. Mehlman noted that prior to Seinfeld he had "barely written any dialogue in [his] life." He first conceived the idea of an episode in which Elaine would move away from Manhattan and Jerry had to confront his feelings about her. He discussed the idea with Seinfeld, David and staff writer Larry Charles, who felt that it would be funnier if Elaine moved closer to Jerry instead. After their meeting, Mehlman was told to write the episode, which surprised him, describing it as "unlike any other show, where they would have given beat for beat for beat." As Mehlman was writing the script, he came up with the idea of George wearing a wedding ring to a party to see how women would react. Though the wedding ring idea was not included in the approved script, Seinfeld and David decided to keep it as it suited George well.

The first table read of the episode was held on January 9, 1991. The episode was filmed in front of a live audience on January 15, 1991. Filming of the episode took place at the CBS Studio Center in Studio City, Los Angeles, California, where, starting with the season two premiere "The Ex-Girlfriend," filming of all the show's episodes took place. A few scenes were changed prior to the filming of the episode. The scene in which Jerry informs George he told Elaine about the apartment initially showed them standing in line for the movies, talking about sitting in the front of the theatre. George would tell Jerry that he once pretended to have a grotesque physical impairment while he was standing in line to get a ticket for The Exorcist, and people would let him go in front of them without saying anything. The location of this scene, however, was changed to Monk's Cafe, a regular hangout for the show's main characters, and George and Jerry's dialogue was shortened. In the original script, Jerry, instead of George, proclaimed himself "lord of the idiots," but this was changed during rehearsals.

"The Apartment" featured the only appearance of Harold and Manny, the two building superintendents. Veteran actors Glenn Shadix and Tony Plana portrayed Harold and Manny, respectively. Their parts in the episode was originally smaller, but they were written into the final scene. Harold was set to return in the season two episode "The Revenge," in which he would tell the show's central characters that Jerry's suicidal neighbor Newman jumped from the building, but an awning broke his fall. However, the Newman subplot in the episode was significantly reduced during production and Harold's part was cut. Theresa Randle, Patricia Ayame Thomson and Leslie Neale guest starred as women George unsuccessfully flirts with while wearing a wedding ring. Louis-Dreyfus' half-sister Lauren Bowles appeared as an extra at the party attended by George, Jerry and Elaine. Bowles would continue to appear regularly throughout the series' run, frequently as a waitress at Monk's Cafe. Additionally, David Blackwood, who appeared as a party guest, also continued to make small appearances on the show. Assistant director Joan Van Horn appeared as a woman feeding her baby at Monk's Cafe.

The episode marks the first time Elaine does her trademark "Get Out!" shove; the catchphrase was not in the original script, but was added at Louis-Dreyfus' suggestion. It became one of the show's popular catchphrases. "The Apartment" is the first episode in which Jerry's apartment number is 5A; it had been changed a few times prior to the broadcast of this episode, but remained 5A until the end of the show. It is also contains one of the few references to Kramer's father, who remained unseen throughout the show's run.

Reception
The episode was first aired in the United States on NBC on April 4, 1991 as part of a Thursday night line-up that also included Cheers and L.A. Law. "The Apartment" gained a Nielsen rating of 16.9 and an audience share of 28, meaning that 16.9% of American households watched the episode, and that 28% of all televisions in use at the time were tuned into it. Nielsen also estimated that 15.7 million homes were tuned into the episode, making Seinfeld the ninth most-watched show in the week the episode was broadcast, while 20.5 million homes tuned into Cheers. Seinfelds ability to keep a large number of Cheers audience eventually helped the show get a third season order.

Ocala Star-Banner critic Jon Burlingame praised the episode for its "smart humor" and stated the show could be a perfect fit between Cheers and L.A. Law. Mike Flaherty and Mary Kaye Schilling of Entertainment Weekly reacted very positively to the episode and praised Alexander's performance in particular, stating "George's profound self-hatred is now in full bloom ('Please, a little respect, for I am Costanza, Lord of the Idiots!'). Kramer's input, meanwhile, remains limited to off-the-wall, often annoying cameos. Which reminds us: Why in the world has Alexander been denied an Emmy, while Richards has scored two?" Schilling and Flaherty graded the episode with a B+. However, The Kitchener-Waterloo Record critic Bonnie Malleck gave the episode a particularly negative review; comparing Seinfeld to It's Garry Shandling's Show, she stated "Seinfeld isn't neurotic enough to be as funny as [Garry Shandling]. So, instead of being nervously funny, he's just nervously dull."

References

External links

"The Apartment" at Sony Pictures

Seinfeld (season 2) episodes
1991 American television episodes